Kaif Ghaury (born 13 March 1964) is a Pakistani-born cricketer who played for the United Arab Emirates national cricket team. He made his only first-class appearance in a match against Malaysia during the 2004 ICC Intercontinental Cup.

References 

1964 births
Living people
Emirati cricketers
Pakistani emigrants to the United Arab Emirates
Pakistani expatriate sportspeople in the United Arab Emirates